Horacio Cifuentes (born 16 March 1998) is an Argentine table tennis player. He competed in the 2020 Summer Olympics.

References

External links

1998 births
Living people
Sportspeople from La Plata
Table tennis players at the 2020 Summer Olympics
Argentine male table tennis players
Olympic table tennis players of Argentina
Pan American Games medalists in table tennis
Pan American Games silver medalists for Argentina
Table tennis players at the 2019 Pan American Games
Medalists at the 2019 Pan American Games
21st-century Argentine people